Micrutalis calva is a species of Hemiptera found in North America. It feeds on numerous plants, including ragweed, sunflower, wormwood, sycamore, alfalfa, and honeylocust. Nymphs specifically can often be found on the flowers of Vernonia.

References

Hemiptera of North America
Membracidae
Taxa named by Thomas Say
Insects described in 1831